The 2013 OFC Futsal Championship, also known as the OFC Futsal Championship Invitational 2013, was the ninth edition of the main international futsal tournament of the Oceanian region, organized by the Oceania Football Confederation (OFC). It took place from 23 to 27 July 2013, and was hosted by Auckland, New Zealand.

Eight teams took part in the tournament, including Malaysia and Australia (appearing as guest nations) and a 'New Zealand Invitational' side.

Group stage

Group A

Group B

Knockout stage

Final positions

Awards
Golden Boot
 Dylan Manickum (8 goals)
Golden Ball
 Toby Seeto
Golden Glove
 Angelo Konstantinou

Goal scorers
8 goals
 Dylan Manickum

6 goals
 Jeffery Bule

5 goals
 Daniel Fogarty
 Khairul Mohd Bahrin
 Yvan Pourouoro
 Mote Tino
 Ben Hungai

4 goals
 Adam Cooper
 Toby Seeto
 Micah Lea'alafah
 Pakoa Rakom

3 goals

 Marino Musumeci
 Mark Symington
 Nizam Mohd Ali
 Abu Hasan
 Fawzul Mohamad
 Shamsul Zamri
 Daniel Burns
 Samuel Osifelo
 Elliot Ragomo

2 goals

 Wade Giovenali
 Chris Zeballos
 Qaiser Abdul Kadir
 Asmie Zahari
 Eric Saihuliwa
 Mohamed Kamri
 Atana Fa'arodo
 Coleman Makau
 George Stevenson
 Malik Paulet
 Jacky John
 Albert Tho

1 goal

 Daniel Fulton
 Firdaus Ambiah
 Thierry Waima
 Landry Parawi
 Stephen Ashby-Peckham
 Charl Compaan
 Marvin Eakins
 Matthew Edridge
 Jan Fischer
 Kareem Osman
 Jakub Sinkora
 James Vaughan
 Mitchell Webber
 Mana Faarahia
 Teivarii Kaiha
 Gaby Kavera
 Landry Parawai
 Antoine Tave
 Jacob Tutavae
 Donald Avock
 Dudley Dominique
 Nalpinie Iasi

Own goals
 Samuel Osifelo (for Malaysia)
 Mainon Kaouwi (for New Zealand)
 Y. Pourouoro (for New Zealand Invitational)

References

OFC Futsal Championship
Oceanian Futsal
Futsal
Association football in Auckland
International futsal competitions hosted by New Zealand